The Czech Pirate Party or Pirates (abbreviated Piráti ) is a liberal progressive political party in the Czech Republic, founded in 2009. The party was founded as a student-driven grassroots movement campaigning for political transparency, civil rights and direct democracy.

The party's program focuses on safeguarding of civil liberties from state or corporate power via government transparency and public participation in democratic decision making. It aims to achieve its agenda by enacting laws for political accountability, anti-corruption, lobbying transparency, tax avoidance prevention, simplifying of state bureaucracy through e-government, supporting small and medium-sized business, funding of local development, promotion of environmental protection, consumer protection and sustainability. The party also aims to reform laws on copyright, financial markets and banking, taxation of multinational corporations, and while it is a pro-European party, it aims to address the perceived democratic deficit in the European Union by decentralization and subsidiarity.

The party contested the 2021 Czech parliamentary election as part of the alliance Pirates and Mayors with the Mayors and Independents party. The alliance gained 37 seats, out of which four are Pirate MPs, and joined the governing Cabinet of Petr Fiala with Spolu. The Pirate party is represented by five Members of the Senate of the Czech Republic, the most recently elected being Adéla Šípová and David Smoljak in 2020 and Lukáš Wagenknecht in 2018. That same year, the party entered a number of municipal assemblies and formed a governing coalition in the Prague City Assembly, with Zdeněk Hřib becoming the Mayor of Prague. In the 2019 European election, the party gained three MEPs, joined the Greens–European Free Alliance parliamentary group and campaign leader Marcel Kolaja was elected one of fourteen Vice-Presidents of the European Parliament. The party holds 99 out of 675 seats in regional councils since the October 2020 elections.

History

Formation and early years (2009–2011) 

The Czech Pirate Party was founded as a student-driven grassroots movement campaigning for political transparency, civil rights and direct democracy. The party was initially inspired by the Swedish Pirate Party, which like most other Pirate Parties was a single-issue party focusing on Internet freedom; however, the Czech Pirate Party has developed a broad political platform.

On 27 May 2009 an application was submitted to the Ministry of the Interior for registration of the party. On 17 June, the party was registered under the code MV-39553-7/VS-2009. Within the first two days of the launch of their website in April, 1,800 people had signed an online petition to register the party. Czech law requires a paper petition with 1,000 signatures for registration. In the student elections, the Pirate Party received 7.7% of the vote.

On 28 June 2009 the party held a constitutive forum in Průhonice, near Prague, where the board was elected and main elements of the program were declared. Kamil Horký was elected as chairman. At the end of October 2009 in Albrechtice nad Orlicí, the General Assembly (GA) met for the first time, to complete statutes and elect a new board, commission and committee. Ivan Bartoš became party chairman.

The party participated in the general election in May 2010, and received 0.8% of the vote.

In December 2010, the party launched its own national whistle-blowing site similar to WikiLeaks, called PirateLeaks. The site was intended as a primary source for journalists, dedicated to evidence of corruption in the Czech government and public administration documents which should be publicly available according to law 106/1999 Sb. (Free Access to Information Act) but which the authorities refused to disclose without a formal request defined by the law.

Parliamentary party (from 2011) 

Standing in a local senate election on 18–19 March 2011 in Kladno, they obtained 0.75% of the vote. In the 2012 Czech Senate election, the Czech Pirate Party nominated three candidates; one of them was a co-nomination with two other parties. This candidate, the whistleblower Libor Michálek, was elected as Senator in the second round of voting, with the Czech Pirate Party becoming a parliamentary party for the first time.

In local elections in 2014 the party entered many local assemblies, including a clear majority in Mariánské Lázně, which resulted in Vojtěch Franta being elected as the party's first mayor. This city became the party's main stronghold outside Prague and its suburbs.

In the 2016 Senate election, the Pirates won two additional seats in the Senate with Ladislav Kos and Renata Chmelová, who were nominated by multi-party coalitions with the Pirates' support.

Following the 2017 legislative election, the party became the third largest party in the Chamber of Deputies with 22 out of 200 seats and sat in opposition to the ruling cabinet. Economist and auditor Lukáš Wagenknecht was elected Senator in the 2018 election, when Michálek's term ended.

The Pirates ranked second in the 2018 Prague municipal election with 13 out of 65 seats and formed a governing coalition with the third and fourth-ranked parties that holds 39 out of 65 seats in the Prague City Assembly. The leading Pirate candidate with 75,082 votes, Zdeněk Hřib, was elected as Mayor of Prague.

With leading candidate Marcel Kolaja in the 2019 European Parliament election, the party ran on a common platform with the European Pirate Party. Kolaja was elected along with Markéta Gregorová and Mikuláš Peksa as Members of the European Parliament. In May 2019, the party negotiated to join the Greens–European Free Alliance parliamentary group along with German Pirate Party MEP Patrick Breyer. In June, all four members of the European Pirate Party joined the parliamentary grouping. On 3 July, Kolaja was elected one of fourteen Vice-Presidents of the European Parliament.

In January 2020, Bartoš was re-elected as party leader. With 14.67% of the vote in the October 2020 regional elections, the party gained 99 out of 675 seats in regional councils. In the 2020 Senate election, the party nominated two successful candidates, David Smoljak and Adéla Šípová, who became the youngest ever member of the Senate at the age of 40, breaking the previous record of Pirate Senator Wagenknecht.

During late 2020 and early 2021, the Pirates formed the Pirates and Mayors electoral alliance for the 2021 legislative election with liberal centre-right party Mayors and Independents (STAN). The alliance won 37 seats, of which four are Pirate MPs, and joined the governing coalition with Spolu. The party nominated three ministers for the incoming Cabinet of Petr Fiala: Ivan Bartoš as Minister of Regional Development and Digitalisation, Jan Lipavský as Minister of Foreign Affairs, and Michal Šalomoun as Minister of Legislation.

Positions and objectives

Political spectrum and ideology 
The Czech Pirate Party is a centrist to centre-left progressive "liberal" party (in contrast to "conservative") within the context of politics of the Czech Republic. The party's leadership expressed that it considers the left–right political spectrum to be obsolete. The party itself describes its stance as economically centrist and socially liberal, in the context of Czech politics.

Domestic policy 
The party's program focuses on safeguarding of civil liberties from state or corporate power through government transparency, accountability and anti-corruption measures, introducing elements of participatory democracy by enabling law proposals by the public through petitions and simplification of state bureaucracy through e-government.

The party proposes a lobby register and a lobbying law reform, measures to address tax avoidance of multinational corporations and limit capital outflow, a bank tax, the strengthening of the Czech National Bank's authority, prevention of financial speculation that leads to financial crises and financial crime; and it is against any taxpayer-funded bank bailouts.

The party has an environmental policy platform entitled "Ecology without ideology", which focuses on the elimination of fossil fuel subsidies, scientific research and development-based support for alternative energy (i.e. renewables and nuclear), sustainable materials management from product design to waste management, sustainable transport with a preference for public transport, and sustainable city planning and urban development.

The party's agricultural policy proposes support for small-scale farmers and community farms instead of subsidizing intensive farming and large agribusinesses. The program promotes biodiversity of crops, and forest management and land management that address the environmental impact of agriculture rather than subsidizing monoculture crops that cause land degradation and have a variety of unsustainable environmental impacts. The Pirates also propose to simplify the producer–consumer chain by supporting infrastructure for the sale of local and seasonal produce.

The party supports LGBT rights in the Czech Republic.

In January 2019 it was reported that the party has proposed the eventual introduction of a universal basic income.

2017 legislative electoral platform 
The party's four main campaign policies in the run-up to the 2017 elections were:
Control of power and government spending through transparency and accountability
Simplification of state bureaucracy by introducing e-government
Supporting small businesses and e-commerce, addressing capital outflow of foreign-owned companies and tax avoidance via offshore financial centres
Safeguarding civil liberties, freedom of information, freedom of speech, democracy and increasing public participation in decision making (participatory democracy)
Furthermore, the Pirates announced policies on transport and logistics, finance, IT, culture, international relations, local development, defence, labour and social issues, industry and trade, justice, interior policy, education and science, healthcare, agriculture and the environment.

European Union and international relations 

The Czech Pirate Party is generally pro-European and pro-Eurozone, while advocating major reforms in both institutions to address the perceived democratic deficit in the European Union. The Pirates propose that the Czech Republic should participate in the mainstream of the European integration and should participate in EU decision making, but should adopt the Euro only if specific conditions are fulfilled. The party also supports Czech membership of NATO, but it is critical of aggression by NATO members and argues that any engagement of NATO forces outside of the territories of its member states should take place only if supported by a United Nations resolution. The party leadership has criticized military invasions by NATO and questioned the legality of the United States-initiated wars in Afghanistan and in Iraq and the 2011 military intervention in Libya by NATO forces.

Among the party's European priorities is technological competitiveness of the EU on the world market, limiting corporate lobbying in the EU and addressing Europe-wide tax avoidance by multinational corporations that offshore profits via tax havens. Furthermore, the party addresses digital rights and prevention of increasing Internet censorship; promotion of environmental protection and consumer protection. The Pirates oppose the Transatlantic Trade and Investment Partnership (TTIP).

2019 European electoral platform 
The program for the European Parliament elections in 2019 was published under the auspices of the European Pirate Party. Its core lies in addressing the democratic deficit in the European Union, decentralization and enacting of the subsidiarity principle: decision making on local and national affairs at the local levels of governance that are close to the citizens of the Member States. In addition to copyright reform or the digital agenda, it covers topics such as education, environment and agriculture, foreign policy, defense, transport and taxation and space programs. The party published its own European priorities in five points:
Protecting European liberty against threats from the outside by strengthening EU defense capability, independence and external border; and against internal threats such as authoritarianism, extremism and censorship
Making European decision-making transparent, decentralized, enabling citizen participation, subsidiarity, reducing EU bureaucracy
Reform taxation of corporations, transparent management of the European budget, support for small and medium-sized businesses
Addressing the causes of climate change and its impacts on the environment, addressing waste management and dependency on fossil fuels, sustainable development and support for rural areas and small farmers
Consumer protection, support for social equality and protection of workers' rights

International affiliations
The party is a member of Pirate Parties International and European Pirates (PPEU). Mikuláš Peksa is a board member of PPEU, and Vojtěch Pikal was a co-chairman of PPI in 2013 and 2014. In April 2012, the party organised a conference of the Pirate Parties International (PPI) in Prague. More than 200 representatives of Pirate parties from 27 countries attended, including the founder of the Pirate movement, Rick Falkvinge; writer Cory Doctorow; and Swedish MEP Amelia Andersdotter.

The party expressed support for the pan-European political movement Democracy in Europe Movement 2025 (DiEM25).

Electoral history

Czech Parliament

Chamber of Deputies

Senate

Regional elections

Local elections

Prague municipal elections

European Parliament

Republic committee

Current vice-chairs

Chair history

See also 
 Civil libertarianism

Literature 
 Maškarinec, P. (2020). Crossing the left-right party divide? Understanding the electoral success of the Czech Pirate Party in the 2017 parliamentary elections. Politics. https://doi.org/10.1177/0263395720920768
 Naxera, Vladimír (2021). 'Let us blow them down!': Corruption as the subject of (non-)populist communication of the Czech Pirate Party. Politics. https://journals.sagepub.com/doi/full/10.1177/02633957211010984
 Šárovec, Daniel (2019) "Assured Newcomers on a Squally Sea? The Czech Pirate Party before and after the 2017 Elections" https://otik.uk.zcu.cz/handle/11025/36375?locale=en

References

External links

 

 
Pirate parties
Liberal parties in the Czech Republic
Internet privacy organizations
Internet-related activism
Computer law organizations
Intellectual property activism
Privacy organizations
Civil liberties advocacy groups
Intellectual property organizations
Internet in the Czech Republic
Political parties supporting universal basic income
Progressive parties
Digital rights organizations
Direct democracy parties in the Czech Republic
Environmentalism in the Czech Republic
Political parties established in 2009
2009 establishments in the Czech Republic
Centrist political parties in the Czech Republic
Centre-left parties in Europe